Poiana is a commune in Dâmbovița County, Muntenia, Romania with a population of 3,897 people. It is composed of two villages, Poiana and Poienița.

References

Communes in Dâmbovița County
Localities in Muntenia